Bason (馬 孫 Mǎsūn or Ma3 Sun1) is a fictional character in the anime and manga Shaman King.

Bason may also refer to:

 Bason, any of the two pans of the balance scale
 Bason, an obsolete word for basin
Bason is the name of a flame-retardant [2028-52-6]
People
 Brian Bason, a professional footballer (soccer player)